Un Certain Matin is a 1991 Burkinabé short film directed by Fanta Régina Nacro and produced by Les Films du Défi. It stars Abdoulaye Komboudri, Andromaque Nacro and Hyppolite Ouangrawa.

It is the first fiction film by a Burkinabé woman. The film was first screened at the 1992 Carthage Film Festival. The film received positive reviews and won several awards at international film festivals.

Plot

Cast
 Abdoulaye Komboudri 
 Andromaque Nacro 
 Hyppolite Ouangrawa

Awards and honours 
 Tanit d'Or Award at Carthage Film Festival in 1992.
 Licorne d'Or Award at Amiens Film Festival in 1992.
 First Prize Air Afrique at Milan Film Festival in 1993.

References

External links
 
 Pioneres del cine: Fanta Regina Nacro

1991 films
Burkinabé drama films
Burkinabé short films